Mohan Jena (14 July 1957 – 12 December 2022) was an Indian politician who was a member of the 14th Lok Sabha. He represented the Jajpur Constituency of Odisha and was a member of the Biju Janata Dal political party. In March 2019, he joined Bharatiya Janata Party in presence of Dharmendra Pradhan and Arun Singh.

Jena died on 12 December 2022, at the age of 65.

See also
 Jajpur (Lok Sabha constituency)
 Indian general election in Orissa, 2009
 Biju Janata Dal

References

1957 births
2022 deaths
People from Jajpur
Biju Janata Dal politicians
India MPs 2004–2009
India MPs 2009–2014
Lok Sabha members from Odisha
Bharatiya Janata Party politicians from Odisha